Andrea Boscoli (c. 1560 – c. 1606) was an Italian painter of the Renaissance.

He was born in Florence, where he trained under Santi di Tito. He painted a Sermon of St John the Baptist for the church of San Giovanni Battista belonging to the Carmelite Teresiani at Rimini. He also painted portraits. He died in Florence about 1606.

References

16th-century Italian painters
Italian male painters
17th-century Italian painters
Painters from Florence
Italian Mannerist painters
1606 deaths
1560s births